In asymptotic analysis, the method of Chester–Friedman–Ursell is a technique to find asymptotic expansions for contour integrals. It was developed as an extension of the steepest descent method for getting uniform asymptotic expansions in the case of coalescing saddle points. The method was published in 1957 by Clive R. Chester, Bernard Friedman and Fritz Ursell.

Method

Setting 
We study integrals of the form

where  is a contour and
  is a large number.

If now an  exists, such that both saddle points coalescent to a new saddle point  with multiplicity , then the steepest descent method no longer gives uniform  asymptotic expansions.

Procedure 

where the coefficients  and  will be determined later.

We have

This gives the following system of equations 

A theorem by Chester–Friedman–Ursell (see below) says now, that the cubic transform is analytic and injective in a local neighbourhood around the critical point .

After the transformation the integral becomes

Here ends the method and one can see the integral representation of the complex Airy function.

Chester–Friedman–Ursell note to write  not as a single power series but instead as

to really get asymptotic expansions.

Theorem by Chester–Friedman–Ursell 
Let  and  be as above. The cubic transformation

Literature

References 

Asymptotic analysis